Saitis mutans is a species of spider in the genus Saitis. It is endemic to Australia.

The male spiders vary in length from 3.35 to 3.72 mm, while the females are slightly longer (3.72 to 4.12 mm). When courting, the male uses simple semaphoring movements of his extended third pair of legs.

Etymology 
The species epithet, mutans, is Latin for "changing", and refers  to the fact that the females 
are highly variable in appearance.

References

mutans
Endemic fauna of Australia
Spiders of Oceania
Spiders described in 2012